This is a list of international football matches of the Switzerland national football team from 1920 until 1939.

Between 1920 and 1939, Switzerland played in 53 matches, resulting in 15 victories, 11 draws and 27 defeats. (through May 5, 1929)

References

Switzerland national football team